Rohan Bopanna and Aisam-ul-Haq Qureshi were the defending champions but chose to compete in the 2010 BNP Paribas Masters instead.
Ruben Bemelmans and Igor Sijsling won the title, defeating Jamie Delgado and Jonathan Marray 6–4, 3–6, [11–9] in the final.

Seeds

Draw

Draw

External links
 Main Draw

Lambertz Open by STAWAG - Doubles
Lambertz Open by STAWAG